Ningbo Fubang Stadium (Simplified Chinese: 宁波富邦体育场) is a football stadium in Ningbo, China. This stadium holds 14,000 people.

Football venues in China
Sports venues in Zhejiang